Mocharim (ancient name Mucalinda) situated in the Gaya district, state of Bihar, India, nearly  south of the Mahabodhi Temple at Bodhgaya. It lies at the western bank of the river Niranjana (Phalgu). It is named after the naga Mucalinda or Muchalinda or Mucilinda, who is said to have protected Buddha from a great rainstorm when he was meditating. The village is home to Muchlind, an ancient pond where Buddha supposedly spent six weeks after attaining enlightenment.

References

External links
Mocharim at deepawali night  (Facebook)
mocharim village group (Facebook)

Villages in Gaya district
Tourist attractions in Bihar
Buddhist sites in Bihar